Vansant Farmhouse, also known as Overlook Valley Farm, is a historic home located near Rushland, Wrightstown Township, Bucks County, Pennsylvania. The original section was built in 1768, and is a two-story stone structure measuring approximately 15 feet square, with a one-story kitchen addition.  The main house was added about 1820, and is two-story, stuccoed-stone structure.  A one-story porch was added in the 20th century.

It was added to the National Register of Historic Places in 1977.

References

Houses on the National Register of Historic Places in Pennsylvania
Houses completed in 1820
Houses in Bucks County, Pennsylvania
National Register of Historic Places in Bucks County, Pennsylvania